{{Infobox film 
| name           = Devil Dogs of the Air 
| image          = Devil-dogs-of-the-air-movie-poster-1935.jpg
| image_size     =
| caption        = Theatrical poster
| producer       = Hal B. WallisJack L. Warner (Executive producer) Lou Edelman (Associate producer)
| director       = Lloyd Bacon
| writer         = Malcolm Stuart BoylanEarl BaldwinJohn Monk Saunders (original story)
| starring       = James CagneyPat O'Brien
| music          = Leo F. Forbstein
| cinematography = Arthur Edeson
| editing        = William Clemens
| studio         = Warner Brothers Pictures (A Cosmopolitan Production)
| distributor    = Warner Bros.
| released       = 
| runtime        = 86 (90) minutes
| country        = United States
| language       = English
| budget         = $385,000 (estimated)<ref name="warners">"Warner Bros financial information in The William Shaefer Ledger." Historical Journal of Film, Radio and Television, Appendix 1, 1995, p. 15:sup1, 1-31 p 16 DOI: 10.1080/01439689508604551</ref>
| gross          = $1,685,000 (worldwide rentals)
}}Devil Dogs of the Air (a.k.a. Flying Marines) is a 1935 Warner Bros. film,  directed by Lloyd Bacon and starring James Cagney and Pat O'Brien, playing similar roles as close friends after making their debut as a "buddy team" in Here Comes the Navy. Devil Dogs of the Air was the second of nine features that James Cagney and Pat O'Brien made together.  The film's storyline was adapted from a novel by John Monk Saunders.

Plot
Lieut. Bill Brannigan (Pat O'Brien) learns friend and hotshot pilot Thomas Jefferson "Tommy" O'Toole (James Cagney), the self-styled "world's greatest aviator", is joining the USMC Reserve Aviator training program. O'Toole arrives at San Diego and promptly starts to move in on Brannigan's love interest, Betty Roberts (Margaret Lindsay), the daughter of the owner of the nearby Happy Landings Cafe. In typical cocky fashion, O'Toole antagonizes nearly everyone else.

Although not temperamentally suited for the military, Tommy completes primary training and after surviving an accident he caused by running out of fuel, eventually realizes that he is willing to change.

Bill is assigned as his instructor, and on the first flight together, when Tommy begins to do some stunt flying, the aircraft has to be abandoned when it catches on fire. Bill bales out, but Tommy defies orders and lands the aircraft, making him a hero. Tommy performs his first solo flight perfectly and then browbeats Betty into attending the solo flight party with him. Bill is not amused.

After a competition in the air with his friend Brannigan flying together, a midair emergency takes place, but it is Bill who saves the aircraft. Tommy makes a good landing, and finds Betty waiting for him. Although their friendship is restored, Bill realizes that Tommy has won Betty and arranges a transfer to another base.

Cast
  
 James Cagney as Thomas Jefferson "Tommy" O'Toole
 Pat O'Brien as Lieut. William R. "Bill" Brannigan
 Margaret Lindsay as Betty Roberts
 Frank McHugh as "Crash" Kelly
 John Arledge as "Mac" Macintosh
 Helen Lowell as Ma Roberts
 Robert Barrat as Commandant
 Russell Hicks as Captain
 William B. Davidson (as William Davidson) as Adjutant, a captain
 Ward Bond as Jimmy, senior instructor
 Bill Elliott (as Gordon Elliott) as Instructor
 Olive Jones as Mrs. Brown
 David Newell as Lieut. Brown
 Helen Flint as Mrs. Johnson
 Harry Seymour as Officer
 Newton House as Officer
 Ralph Nye as Officer
 Selmer Jackson as Officer
 Bill Beggs as Officer
 Robert Spencer as Bob
 Bud Flanagan as Student
 Don Turner as Student
 Dick French as Student
 Charles Sherlock as Student
 Carlyle Blackwell Jr.as Messenger

Production
Principal photography starting on October 1, 1934, was based at the US Naval Base San Diego. Paul Mantz did the aerial stunts for Cagney. One of the featured squadrons stationed there, Marine Attack Squadron 231 (VMA-231) after returning to San Diego in 1928, had traded in its World War I-era O2B-1s for new Curtiss F8C-1s and F8C-3s, which were soon redesignated OC-1s and OC-2s. Shortly after receiving the F8C/OCs, the squadron, along with VO-10M took part in the filming of the 1929 movie Flight and later, prominently appeared in the  Devil Dogs of the Air.

The rare U.S. Marine Corps Curtiss RC-1 air ambulance, A-8864, made an appearance in the film. Other unusual types that appear in the film include:
 Loening OL-8 two-seat amphibian biplane
 Travel Air D-4000 civilian stunt biplane
 Vought O2U Corsair two-seat scout biplane
 Boeing F4B single-seat pursuit biplane
 Ford Trimotor multi-passenger transport
 Douglas Dolphin

Maneuvers (wargames) by the United States Navy and the USMC are the actual "stars" of the movie. In the film, the USN represented the BLUE Force while the enemy was the BROWN Force. 

Reception
Released in an era of patriotic films with overt propaganda themes that set the scene for war preparations, Devil Dogs of the Air received a mildly appreciative public acceptance. Although it had a major release in 1935, the film was re-released in 1941, just before America's entry into World War II, again finding a receptive audience. Critic Leonard Maltin described it as a "tiresome potboiler with Marine Air Corps rivalry between Cagney and O'Brien. Their personalities and good stunt-flying scenes are the only saving grace." Mainly considered hackneyed, it was best considered an aviation film and today, represents an authentic look at the period.

Box Office
According to Warner Bros records, Devil Dogs of the Air earned $1,185,000 domestically and $504,000 foreign.

References
Notes

Citations

Bibliography

 Dolan, Edward F. Jr. Hollywood Goes to War. London: Bison Books, 1985. .
 Hardwick, Jack and Ed Schnepf. "A Viewer's Guide to Aviation Movies". The Making of the Great Aviation Films, General Aviation Series, Volume 2, 1989.
 Orriss, Bruce. When Hollywood Ruled the Skies: The Aviation Film Classics of World War II. Hawthorne, California: Aero Associates Inc., 1984. .
 Rottman, Gordon L. U.S. Marine Corps World War II Order of Battle: Ground and Air Units in the Pacific War, 1939 - 1945.. Westport, Connecticut: Greenwood Press, 2002. .
 Sherrod, Robert. History of Marine Corps Aviation in World War II''. Washington, D.C.: Combat Forces Press, 1952.

External links
 
 Turner Classic Movies: Devil Dogs of the Air
 

American aviation films
1935 films
Films directed by Lloyd Bacon
Warner Bros. films
Films about the United States Marine Corps
American action comedy-drama films
1930s action comedy-drama films
American black-and-white films
1930s English-language films
1930s American films